Eimantas Poderis (born 13 September 1973) is a Lithuanian former football forward. He obtained a total number of 21 caps for the Lithuania national football team, scoring five goals. Poderis also played as a professional in Russia and Israel during his career.

Honours
National Team
 Baltic Cup
 1992
 2005

References

1973 births
Living people
Lithuanian footballers
Lithuania international footballers
Association football forwards
Lithuanian expatriate footballers
Russian Premier League players
FK Žalgiris players
FK Inkaras Kaunas players
FC Spartak Vladikavkaz players
Hakoah Maccabi Amidar Ramat Gan F.C. players
Maccabi Herzliya F.C. players
Liga Leumit players
FC Vilnius players
FBK Kaunas footballers
Expatriate footballers in Russia
Expatriate footballers in Israel
Lithuanian expatriate sportspeople in Russia
Lithuanian expatriate sportspeople in Israel